The Minister of Foreign Affairs of the Republic of Turkey is the government minister who heads the Ministry of Foreign Affairs and is a member of the Cabinet of Turkey. The minister is responsible for overseeing the international relations of the government, though specific relations involving Turkey's accession negotiations with the European Union are handled by the Directorate for EU Affairs.

The office was established in 1920 during the Turkish War of Independence, after which Bekir Sami Kunduh became the first Minister to hold the office. The incumbent officeholder is Mevlüt Çavuşoğlu, who took office on 24 November 2015 after Prime Minister Ahmet Davutoğlu formed his third government.

History of the office

Ottoman era
Before the establishment of the Turkish Republic, foreign affairs were handled by the 'Reis-ül Küttap' (Head Secretary) of the Ottoman Empire until the 19th century. In 1836, the Head Secretariat was upgraded to a Ministry and became the Ministry of Foreign Affairs of the Ottoman Empire, with the last Reis-ül Küttap, Yozgatlı Akif Efendi, becoming the first minister responsible.

Republic era
With the establishment of the Grand National Assembly of Turkey during the War of Independence, the Ministry of Foreign Affairs of Turkey was established on 3 May 1920 with Bekir Sami Kunduh becoming the first minister responsible, with the legislative Act No. 1154 in 1927 laying down the legal functions of the Foreign Ministry. The Turkish diplomatic service was significantly expanded after the Second World War despite ASALA terrorist attacks against Turkish diplomats occurring in the 1970s.

List of Ministers of Foreign Affairs

Since the office was established in 1920, there have been 43 Ministers of Foreign Affairs. Ministers are appointed by the Prime Minister of Turkey as part of his or her cabinet, after which the President of Turkey validates the appointment of the minister. The minister is usually a Member of Parliament, though Prime Ministers reserve the right to appoint ministers from outside parliament if they see fit. A notable example was the appointment of Ahmet Davutoğlu as foreign minister in 2009 despite not being an MP.

See also
Minister of Foreign Affairs
Foreign policy of the Recep Tayyip Erdoğan government
Foreign relations of Turkey

References

External links
Biography of the Minister

 
Turkish ministerial offices